Polycatini is a weevil tribe in the subfamily Entiminae.

References 

 Marshall, G.A.K. 1956: Notes on the Campyloscelinae (Coleoptera Curculionidae). Revue de zoologie et de botanique africaines, 54(3-4): 224–240.
 Alonso-Zarazaga, M.A.; Lyal, C.H.C. 1999: A world catalogue of families and genera of Curculionoidea (Insecta: Coleoptera) (excepting Scolytidae and Platypodidae). Entomopraxis, Barcelona.

External links 

Entiminae
Beetle tribes